Vandi is a 2018 Tamil-language action thriller film directed by Rajeesh Bala. The film stars Vidharth, Chandini Tamilarasan and John Vijay. Produced by Rooby Films, its music is composed by Sooraj Kurup. It was released worldwide on 23 November 2018. The film revolves around three friends who get into trouble over a missing motorcycle and a stolen motorcycle.

Cast  

 Vidharth as Krishna
 Chandini Tamilarasan as Swati
 John Vijay
 Sriram Karthick
 Kishore Kumar
 Supergood Subramani
 Uma as Servant
J.Navin Kumar

Critical Reception 
The film received mostly poor reviews from critics. Times of India gave 2/5 stars quoting that the film suffers from sloppy writing. New Indian Express wrote "It requires great skill to write dialogue that feels at once both real and purposeful. Vandi’s dialogues, however, seem placed for no reason except to conspire to achieve its runtime of 150 minutes." giving it just 1.5/5.

References

External links 

2018 films
2010s Tamil-language films
Indian action films
Films scored by Sooraj S. Kurup
2018 action films